Doubt is an American opera in two acts by Douglas J. Cuomo to a libretto by John Patrick Shanley. It is an adaptation of Shanley's Pulitzer-Prize-winning 2004 play of the same title, which had been made into an Oscar-nominated 2008 film. Minnesota Opera commissioned the work and produced its premiere in 2013 at the Ordway Center for the Performing Arts. Conducted by Christopher Franklin and directed by Kevin Newbury, the cast featured Christine Brewer as Sister Aloysius (soprano), Adriana Zabala as Sister James (mezzo-soprano), Matthew Worth as Father Flynn (baritone), Denyce Graves as Mrs. Miller (mezzo-soprano), and Julius Andrews as Donald Miller.

References

2013 operas
Catholicism in fiction
English-language operas
Nuns in fiction
Operas
Operas based on plays
Operas set in the 20th century
Operas set in the United States